The men's singles was one of five events of the 1922 World Hard Court Championships tennis tournament held in Brussels, Belgium from 13 until 21 May 1922. The draw consisted of 62 players. Bill Tilden was the defending champion, but did not participate. Frenchman Henri Cochet won the title after defeating Spaniard Manuel de Gomar in the final.

Draw

Finals

Top half

Section 1

Section 2

Bottom half

Section 3

Section 4

References 

Men's Singles